The Equator Art Society was an artists' group founded in 1956 in Singapore, known for promoting social realist art. The Equator Art Society sought to represent the realities and struggles of the masses, depicting Singapore's working classes and the poor often through the use of portraiture painting, woodcut prints, and sculpture. Founding society members and leaders included artists such as Lim Yew Kuan, Lai Kui Fang, Chua Mia Tee, Ong Kim Seng and Koeh Sia Yong. 

Active during and following the period of the Malayan Emergency, the Equator Art Society was notably anti-colonial and nationalistic, with its members often critical of the colonial government and supportive of the formulation of a distinct Malayan consciousness. The Equator Art Society was de-registered on 11 January 1974, with social realist art declining in Singapore in the 1970s.

History

The Singapore Chinese Middle Schools' Graduates of 1953 Arts Association 
After World War II, the burgeoning sense of nationalism and anti-colonialism instilled a greater desire within artists to reflect the ongoing social and political conditions of Singapore and Malaya. The movement of social realism gained currency in Singapore from the mid-1950s onwards, with artists intent on reflecting lived experience in Singapore through the use of realist-style painting and a socially-engaged practice that would directly involve their subjects to create works that commented on social issues. For instance, artists would interact with workers to understand and gain a lived experience of their problems, a means of conducting their own research into the struggles of the working classes. 

In 1956, an art association comprising students from local Chinese middle schools, the Singapore Chinese Middle Schools' Graduates of 1953 Arts Association (SCMSGAA), held a travelling fundraising exhibition. The show sought to raise funds for building Singapore's only Chinese-language private university, Nantah (later merged to form the present-day National University of Singapore). The association first exhibited at the Chinese Chamber of Commerce in Singapore, and later in Kuala Lumpur and Penang. At this travelling exhibition, Chua Mia Tee would present his now well-known oil painting, Epic Poem of Malaya (1955), a work that embodies the desire to inculcate a distinct Malayan nationalism in the younger generation. 

Championing social realism as a means of representing the realities of the working class and propelling social change, the exhibition catalogue would state their belief that "Art belongs to the people—it is the public, and should serve the public," further proclaiming that they were "prepared to commit all our efforts to help Malaya gain her independence and her process of nation-building." The SCMSGAA ceased activities after the exhibition, likely due to its perceived left-leaning politics and its strong criticism of colonial administration. The SCMSGAA was dissolved in October 1956, within a month of the dissolution of the Singapore Chinese Middle School Students' Union and the Chinese middle schools riots.

Founding 
On 22 June 1956, a new art society called the Equator Art Society (EAS) was registered, comprising many members previously from SCMSGAA. The EAS organised exhibitions for its members, conducted art theoretical research and study seminars, also holding art classes at beginner, intermediate, and advanced levels. Besides its visual art wing, the society also had active wings for literature, music, and theatre. EAS would also contribute to the emergence of the woodcut movement in the 1950s. By the society’s de-registering on 11 January 1974, the EAS had held 6 exhibitions at locations including the Victoria Memorial Hall, the Chinese Chamber of Commerce, and its premises at 56 Lorong 32 in Geylang.

In 1958, the EAS organised its inaugural exhibition, which featured over 400 works such as sculpture and paintings in oils, watercolours, and pastels. Portraiture would dominate as the main genre of work shown at this exhibition. Works such as Tay Boon Pin's Teh Tarik Seller (1969) and Lim Yew Kuan's Painting Class (1957) demonstrate the types of portraits produced by members of EAS, depicting students and hawkers that represent familiar social groups woven within the social fabric of Singapore. Such influences could be traced to realist artists such as Gustave Courbet and Auguste Rodin from Europe, as well as Ilya Repin from Russia. 

The 1960 Equator Art Society exhibition would see the presentation of significant works such as Chua Mia Tee's National Language Class (1959) and Lai Kui Fang's Bedok Flood (1959).

Marco Hsü's 1963 book, A Brief History of Malayan Art, would discuss the "vibrant young artists" from EAS in Chapter Fourteen, documenting their ideological output by extensively citing from the exhibition catalogues of the society.

Decline and disbanding 
From 1965 onwards, however, following Singapore's separation from Malaysia and Singapore's establishment as an independent nation, the radical leftist nature of social realist art lost its favour with the People's Action Party-led government, which now focussed on controlled political expression in its nation-building drive. The state encouraged the creation of artworks that reflected benign local landscapes and subject matter such as the Singapore River, Chinatown, and Samsui women, also supportive of the emergence of modern abstract art in Singapore, as noted with the formation of the Modern Art Society in 1964. 

Despite the long history of woodcut practices in Singapore, it was only in 1966 that the first post-war woodcut exhibition was held, with the so-called Six Men Show held at the National Library Lecture Hall and opened by the then Minister of Culture, Lee Khoon Choy. Yet, the social realist art style in Singapore declined from the 1970s onward, and the Equator Art Society disbanded by the mid-1970s, de-registering on 11 January 1974.

By the society's de-registering, the EAS had held 6 exhibitions at locations including the Victoria Memorial Hall, the Chinese Chamber of Commerce, and its premises at 56 Lorong 32 in Geylang.

In art history and exhibitions 
Texts by EAS members were extensively cited in Chapter Fourteen of Marco Hsü's 1963 book A Brief History of Malayan Art, with these citations later serving as important documentation of the society's ideological output, with the disappearance of such ephemera from the local art scene. The EAS' activity would also be historicised in Channels & Confluences: A History of Singapore Art, a publication produced alongside the opening of the Singapore Art Museum in 1996. 

It would also take several decades after the 1966 woodcut show before another major show featuring the technique would happen, with the Singapore History Museum exhibition History Through Prints: Woodblock Prints in Singapore held in 1998.

In 2004, artist Koh Nguang How would initiate the project titled Errata: Page 71, Plate 47. Image caption. Change Year: 1950 to Year: 1959; Reported September 2004 by Koh Nguang How. Held at p-10, it began by identifying a dating error in a caption for Chua Mia Tee's National Language Class in Kwok Kian Chow's book Channels & Confluences: A History of Singapore Art.

In 2007, the exhibition From Words to Pictures: Art During the Emergency would be held at the Singapore Art Museum, a show examining social realist artworks in Singapore through the historical frame of the Malayan Emergency. In 2013, the former members of EAS held the exhibition 137km North of the Equator: A Story of the Equator Art Society and Realist Artists in Singapore at Artcommune Gallery. With the opening of the National Gallery Singapore in 2015, artworks produced by EAS members would be featured in the inaugural exhibition at the Singapore Gallery, Siapa Nama Kamu? Art in Singapore since the 19th Century.

Art

Portraiture and social realist paintings 
The Equator Art Society often sought to represent familiar social groups woven within the social fabric of Singapore. Such influences could be traced to realist artists such as Gustave Courbet and Auguste Rodin from Europe, as well as Ilya Repin from Russia.

One of the most well-known social realist paintings from the EAS is Chua Mia Tee's National Language Class (1959), a work that has been interpreted a reflection of emerging nationalist identity, with Malay language uniting the various ethnic communities. The painting depicts Singaporeans of different ethnicities attempting to free themselves from English, the language of their colonial masters, by learning Malay, the national language of Singapore, Malaya, and the Malay World. They are seated at a round table, a symbol of equality, with the Malay teacher posing two simple questions to his students: Siapa nama kamu? Di-mana awak tinggal? (What is your name? Where do you live?). These seemingly simple questions are loaded with political symbolism, illustrating the dynamics of the late 1950s and early 1960s, when the Malay language was a social bridge and major medium of communication in Singapore. Then, left-wing Chinese school students demanded that the study of Malay replace English in their Chinese medium schools in preparation for merger with Malaya.

Woodcut prints 

Apart from portraiture painting, the emergence of the woodcut movement in the 1950s marked a significant decade in the history of social realism. The use of woodcut could be traced back to ideas from the woodcut movement from China, as propagated by Lu Xun. Woodcut prints, as accessible expressions of everyday life, could be disseminated through print media such as magazines and newspapers, allowing an alternative mode of exhibiting beyond the walls of an art gallery and raise awareness of sociopolitical issues. For instance, the woodblock print 13th May Incident (1954) by Choo Cheng Kwan would depict policemen ordered by the colonial administration to use force to disperse protesting Chinese middle school students who were against the National Service Ordinance. Coming into effect 1 March 1954, the students saw this as being forcibly conscripted to serve the interests of a British colonial government that discriminated against them in the past. Lim Yew Kuan's After the Fire (Bukit Ho Swee) (1966) depicts the aftermath of a landscape ravaged by fire, a common occurrence in Singapore estates such as Tiong Bahru and Havelock Road, with one of the most serious being the Bukit Ho Swee Fire of 1961.

References

External links 

 https://eresources.nlb.gov.sg/infopedia/articles/SIP_1253_2006-11-30.html
 http://www.postcolonialweb.org/singapore/arts/painters/channel/15.html
https://www.academia.edu/6454687/_Fragments_of_the_Past_Political_Prints_of_Post_war_Singapore?auto=download

1956 establishments in Singapore
Modern art
Singaporean art
Singaporean artist groups and collectives
Social realism